The Pennsylvania Governor's School for the Arts (PGSA) was one of the Pennsylvania Governor's Schools of Excellence, a group of five-week summer academies for gifted high school students in the Commonwealth of Pennsylvania. The school was hosted each summer first by Bucknell University, then by Mercyhurst College. PGSA was defunded by Pennsylvania's 2009–2010 state budget.

Overview
Pennsylvania Governor's School for the Arts was established earliest among eight such Governor's schools. Like other Pennsylvania Governor's Schools of Excellence, PGSA operated on a state-funded, scholarship basis. Upon its inception in 1973 under Milton Shapp, PGSA was hosted at Bucknell University in Lewisburg under the direction of Arthur Gatty, who led the program until 1988. It was seen as an early leader in such programs, and among the first in the country. By 1985, the school drew 225 students from 2,000 applicants. In 1990, the program was relocated to Mercyhurst College in Erie.  Similar to a college experience, students took various classes associated with a "major" in one of five art areas: creative writing, dance, music, theater, or visual arts. In addition to these classes, students selected an elective class in an art area other than their primary. Collaboration and multifaceted projects were encouraged and common. Alongside classes, nightly performances and gallery shows combined with a broad range of social activities and special events to create a unique experience similar to that of an artists' colony.

Defunding
Governor Ed Rendell's 2009–2010 budget proposed cutting funding for all the schools in the PGSE program, including PGSA. The program was discontinued in 2009, after 36 years of operation.

Notable alumni
Kevin Bacon ('74) 
Melinda Wagner (composer) ('74)
Richard O'Donnell (playwright) ('74)
Aaron Jay Kernis ('75)
Megan Gallagher ('76) 
Gary Schocker ('76)
Boris Bally ('77)
Ian Gallanar ('78)
Suzanne Keen ('79)
Daniel Roebuck ('79)
Alice Sebold ('79)
Julia Kasdorf ('80)
Tina Fey ('87)
Ari Hoenig ('90)
Asali Solomon ('90)
Steven Burns ('91) 
Meagan Miller ('91)
Matthew Hoch ('93)
Zachary Quinto ('94)
Neal Dodson ('94)
Stephen Karam ('97)
Katharine Beutner ('98)
Gillian Jacobs ('99)
Andy Mientus ('04)
Derek Hansen (‘07)

References

Art schools in Pennsylvania
Education in Pennsylvania
Educational institutions established in 1973
Gifted education
1973 establishments in Pennsylvania